Sergio Duran Vega (born 1993) is a Costa Rican chess player. He was awarded the title International Master by FIDE in 2017.

Career
Sergio Duran Vega represented Costa Rica at the 39th Chess Olympiad in 2010 and the 41st Chess Olympiad in 2014.

He was one of four players ending on 8.5 out of 10 at the 2019 American Continental Championship, qualifying for the Chess World Cup 2019, where he was defeated by fourth seed Wesley So in the first round.

References

External links

Sergio Duran Vega games at 365Chess.com 

1999 births
Living people
Costa Rican chess players
Chess Olympiad competitors